The Șerbăneasa is a right tributary of the river Topolog in Romania.

References

Rivers of Romania
Rivers of Vâlcea County